Vegard Skjerve (born 22 May 1988) is a retired Norwegian footballer who spent his career as a defender in Haugesund.

Club career

Skjerve was born in Rennebu. He made his debut for Haugesund on 6 April 2008 against Notodden.

Planning to retire after the 2018 season, an injury forced him to retire prematurely with a month left.

Career statistics

References

1988 births
Living people
People from Rennebu
Norwegian footballers
Association football defenders
FK Haugesund players
Eliteserien players
Norwegian First Division players
Sportspeople from Trøndelag